The Museum of History and Civilizations is an archaeological museum in Rabat, Morocco. Opened in 1932, it contains the most extensive collection of archaeological artifacts found in the country.

See also
Marrakech Museum
Museum of Contemporary Art (Tangier)

References

External links

Maroc.net
Flickr images

Buildings and structures in Rabat
Museums in Morocco
Museums established in 1932
Archaeological museums
1930s establishments in Morocco
20th-century architecture in Morocco